Susan Smith (née Daniels 1961 – June 8, 1989) was an American FBI informant. She was strangled by her handler and lover, FBI agent Mark Putnam. Putnam was the first FBI agent to be charged in a homicide.

Early life
Susan Daniels Smith was born in 1961 in Matewan, West Virginia, to Sidney "Sid" Daniels, an unemployed and former coal miner, and Tracy Daniels, a housekeeper. She was the fifth of nine children (including her sister Shelby Ward). Her parents moved to Freeburn, Kentucky, when Susan was an infant. She studied at Freeburn grade school, but dropped out in 7th grade, because of financial problems within her family.

Events

Background
In 1977, Susan Smith met Kenneth Smith, a local dealer of methamphetamine, PCP, and cocaine. He was 22 at the time, she was 15. They married in the late 1970s, and soon after Kenneth was arrested on November 27, 1979. By the mid-1980s, Susan had given birth to two children. However, the couple started to have a conflicted relationship, highly compromised by drug abuse. Susan and Kenneth eventually divorced, although they kept sharing their home with each other and their children.

Smith's early contact
In 1987, an FBI agent named Mark Putnam began his first investigation in Pikeville, Kentucky. His aim was to arrest a famous 32-year-old ex-convict and bank robber, Carl Edward "Cat Eyes" Lockhart. A local sheriff's deputy, Albert "Bert" Hartfield, recommended that his longtime friend Susan Smith visit Putnam to earn extra income and to help him with the case. Smith and Putnam met in the spring of 1987, and they began to have frequent contact for the exchange of information about Lockhart's upcoming criminal plans. Lockhart was apprehended in December 1987 and the next year sentenced to 57 years in federal prison on charges of robbery. Smith received $5,000 (equivalent to over $11,000 as of 2020) for her contribution to the case.

Adultery and Murder
According to Putnam, his contact with Smith became less frequent after Lockhart's case was closed. However, Smith insisted on continuing their relationship, and by mid-1988, they had begun an active sexual relationship. Putnam, however, was aware his behavior could damage his career and his family, and in early 1989, he signed a petition to be transferred from Kentucky to Florida, in order to focus on other cases. Still, in mid-1989 he had to return to complete an unrelated investigation. When he reached Kentucky, Smith contacted him about her pregnancy and told him the baby was his. Putnam insisted he and his wife Kathy could adopt the baby but Smith refused.
 
On June 8, 1989, Putnam took Smith in his rental car to a clearing, and after a brief discussion and threats by both sides, they began to fight.  At that time, Putnam strangled and killed Smith and placed her body in the trunk of his car. The next day, he dumped Smith's body along an old coal mining road. Putnam left Kentucky and returned to his family in Florida. Three days later, Smith was reported missing by her sister, Shelby Ward.

In 1990, the investigation into Smith's death became an FBI matter, as Putnam was under suspicion for her disappearance. Putnam underwent a polygraph exam, which he failed. He subsequently confessed, pleaded guilty to strangling Smith, and told authorities where to find her body. That same year, he was sentenced to 16 years in prison.

Murderer
Mark Steven Putnam (born July 4, 1959) is a criminologist and former FBI agent (1987-1990). He is the first FBI agent convicted of murder. He studied at the University of Tampa, where he majored in criminology. In October 1986, Putnam graduated from the FBI Academy and shortly thereafter, married Kathy Putnam, the daughter of a wealthy real estate developer.

Despite being sentenced to 16 years in prison, Putnam served only 10 years due to good behavior, and was described as a "model inmate".

In 1998, his wife Kathy died from organ failure due to alcoholism.

Putnam was released from prison in 2000, at age 41. He moved to Georgia, remarried, and was working as a personal trainer in 2016.

In popular culture
The case was the subject of The FBI Killer (1992), a book by American investigator Aphrodite Jones.
The case also appears on Season 1 Episode 1 of the Investigation Discovery series Betrayed.
Another book written about the case, Above Suspicion (also released in 1992) was written by Joe Sharkey. A film adaptation of this book, Above Suspicion, was released on June 20, 2019, starring Emilia Clarke as Susan Smith, and Jack Huston as Mark Putnam.

References

Deaths by person in Kentucky
Deaths by strangulation in the United States
Female murder victims
June 1989 events in the United States
Murder in Kentucky
1989 in Kentucky
1989 murders in the United States
Federal Bureau of Investigation misconduct
Federal Bureau of Investigation agents convicted of crimes
History of women in Kentucky